Edmund is a masculine given name or surname in the English language. The name is derived from the Old English elements ēad, meaning "prosperity" or "riches", and mund, meaning "protector".

Persons named Edmund include:

People

Kings and nobles
Edmund the Martyr (died 869 or 870), king of East Anglia
Edmund I (922–946), King of England from 939 to 946
Edmund Ironside (989–1016), also known as Edmund II, King of England in 1016
Edmund of Scotland (after 1070 – after 1097)
Edmund Crouchback (1245–1296), son of King Henry III of England and claimant to the Sicilian throne
Edmund, 2nd Earl of Cornwall (1249–1300), earl of Cornwall; English nobleman of royal descent
Edmund of Langley, 1st Duke of York (1341–1402), son of King Edward III of England
Edmund Tudor, earl of Richmond (1430–1456), English and Welsh nobleman
Edmund, Prince of Schwarzenberg (1803–1873), the last created Austrian field marshal of the 19th century

In religion
 Saint Edmund (disambiguation), religious title given to several persons
 Eadmund of Winchester (died between 833 and 838), once thought to have been a Bishop of Winchester
 Edmund of Durham (died 1041), Bishop of Durham
 Edmund Arrowsmith (1585–1628), Jesuit, one of the Forty Martyrs of England and Wales
 Edmund Campion (1540–1581), English Jesuit priest and martyr
 Edmund Gennings (1567–1591), English priest and martyr
 Edmund Kalau (1928–2014), German missionary and minister
 Edmund Peiris (1897–1989), Sri Lankan Roman Catholic priest, Bishop of Chilaw from 1940-1972
 Edmund Rich (1175–1240), also called Edmund of Abingdon; Archbishop of Canterbury
 Edmund Ignatius Rice (1762–1844), founder of the Congregation of Christian Brothers

In politics
Edmund Burke (1729–1797), Irish statesman, political theorist, and philosopher
Edmund Barton (1849−1920), Australian prime minister
Edmund Joseph Cooray, Sri Lankan Senator, Minister of Justice of Sri Lanka from March 1960 to July 1960
Edmund Bernard Dimbulane, Sri Lankan Member of Parliament for Alutnuwara
Edmund Rowland Gooneratna (1845–1914), Sri Lankan Gate Mudaliyar, scholar, planter, Buddhist revivalist
Edmund L. Oldfield (1863–1938), American politician
Edmund Walter Jayawardena, Sri Lankan lawyer and diplomat
Edmund Muskie (1914–1996), American Secretary of State
Edmund G. Brown, Sr. (1905–1996), commonly known as Pat Brown; governor of California, 1959–1967
Edmund G. Brown, Jr. (born 1938), commonly known as Jerry Brown; governor of California
Edmund Peiris, Sri Lankan Muhandiram
Edmund Samarakkody (1912–1992), Sri Lankan Trotskyist, trade unionist
Edmund Stoiber (born 1941),  German politician, former minister-president of the state of Bayern
Edmund Tsaturyan (1937–2010), Armenian politician, member of the National Assembly of Armenia
Edmund (Tiruchendur MLA), Indian politician, elected to the Tamil Nadu legislative assembly in 1971

In other fields
Sir Edmund Andros (1637–1714), English colonial administrator under the Royal House of Stuart
Edmund Anscombe (1874–1948), New Zealand architect
Edmund Cobb (1892–1974), American actor
Edmund Collein (1906–1992), East German architect and Bauhaus photographer
Edmund Crispin, pseudonym of English crime fiction writer Bruce Montgomery (1921–1978)
Edmund Davy (1785–1857), English chemist
Edmund Fritz (before 1918after 1932), Austrian actor, film director, and music manager
Edmund H. Garrett (1853–1929), American artist
Edmund Gettier (1927–2021), American philosopher
Edmund Goulding (1891–1959), British film writer and director
Edmund Gunter (1581–1626), British mathematician
Edmund Gwenn (1877–1959), British actor
Edmund Hashim (1933–1974), American actor
Edmund Hewavitarne (1873–1915), Sri Lankan businessman and army reservist
Sir Edmund Hillary (1919–2008), New Zealand mountaineer
Edmund Husserl (1859–1938), philosopher and mathematician
Edmund Ironside, 1st Baron Ironside, Sir William Edmund Ironside (1880–1951), field marshal and chief of the British Imperial General Staff
Edmund Ironside, 2nd Baron Ironside (1924–2020), British politician and engineer, son of William Edmund Ironside
Edmund Kemper (born 1948), American serial killer and necrophile
Edmund Blair Leighton (1852–1922), British artist 
Edmund Lenihan (born 1950), Irish author and storyteller
Edmund Lowe (1890–1971), American actor
Edmund P. Murray (1930–2007), American novelist and journalist
Edmund Rack (c. 1735–1787), English writer
Edmund Reid (1846–1917), head of the Metropolitan Police's CID during the time of the Jack the Ripper
Ed Skoronski (1910–1996), American football player
Edmund Kirby Smith (1824–1893), American general, telegraph president, and professor of mathematics and botany.
Edmund Sonnenblick (1932–2007), American cardiologist
Edmund Spenser (1552–1599), English poet
Edmund Wilson (1895–1972), American writer and literary critic

Surname
Kyle Edmund (born 1995), British tennis player

Fictional characters
Edmund, an antagonist in the play King Lear by William Shakespeare
Edmund Bertram, character in the novel Mansfield Park by Jane Austen
Edmund Blackadder, the protagonist of the BBC historical comedy series Blackadder
Edmund Pevensie, main character in several of The Chronicles of Narnia book series by C. S. Lewis, in which he is/was "King Edmund the Just"
King Edmund, supporting character in the animated show of Tangled in which he had ruled the uninhabitable Dark Kingdom twenty-five years prior. He is also the long-lost father of Eugene Fitzherbert, making the reformed thief a prince by birth

See also
 
 Edmund (disambiguation)
Edmunds (disambiguation)
Edmond (disambiguation)
Edmund Ironside (disambiguation)
Edmunds
Edward

References

English masculine given names
English-language masculine given names
Old English given names
German masculine given names
Polish masculine given names